USS Amethyst (PYc-3) was the yacht Samona II taken into service in the United States Navy serving as a patrol boat during World War II. After military service the vessel was returned to civilian status in 1946 and again became the yacht Samona II until sale and subsequent names of Pudlo and Explorer.

Yacht Samona II
Samona II was designed by Leslie Edward (Ted) Geary and built by Craig Shipbuilding Company, Long Beach, California for Willitts J. Hole, a prominent financier of Los Angeles, California as hull number 154 with keel laid 15 March 1931, launch on 25 June and maiden voyage on 31 July 1931.

The design included five double staterooms with connecting baths and a large owner's stateroom.

On 1 August 1931, the day after leaving the yard on delivery, Samona II departed on a shakedown trip to Alaska. On 9 November 1931 the yacht was on the way via the Panama Canal to the east coast of South America where, after a time exploring the Amazon and Rio Negro rivers, a course was followed through the Strait of Magellan and up the west coast of South America to Los Angeles.

Willitts Hole died in 1936 and his estate, including the Willitts J. Hole Art Collection, passed eventually to his daughter Agnes Hole Rindge and son-in-law Samuel K. Rindge. The Rindges continued the yacht's collecting tradition after Hole's death into 1939.

World War II service
Samona II was purchased by the Navy on 4 November 1940, from Samuel K. Rindge of Los Angeles. The yacht was converted for naval service by Craig Shipbuilding; and commissioned on 27 February 1941.

US Navy service
The ship was assigned to the Inshore Patrol, 11th Naval District, and helped to patrol the entrance to Los Angeles Harbor. After the United States entered the war, the yacht expanded her role to include escorting vessels and convoys as well as carrying local passenger traffic.

On 1 April 1943, Amethyst was attached to the Surface Task Group, Southern Section, San Pedro, California, and continued her patrol duties off the southern California coast through January 1944. She was decommissioned on 2 February 1944.

US Coast Guard service
Placed back in commission on 19 April 1944 and manned by a Coast Guard crew, Amethyst reported to the Western Sea Frontier section base at Treasure Island, California. Through the end of 1945, the ship maintained plane guard station, collected weather  data, and carried out antisubmarine and antiaircraft coastal patrols.

Amethyst was decommissioned at San Diego, California, on 27 February 1946. Her name was struck from the Navy List on 12 March. She was transferred on 11 September to the Maritime Commission for disposal.

Post war
She was subsequently sold back to Samuel K. Rindge and resumed the name Samona II and served as a yacht. Purchased in the early 1950s by David P. Hamilton of Shreveport, Louisiana, she served him under the name Pudlo until sold in 1962 to Clarene Y. Martin of Houston, Texas, and renamed Explorer. As of 2000, she was still reported to be in use along the Gulf Coast.

References

Further reading
6,000 Carefree Miles
World War II U.S. Navy Vessels in Private Hands
Haiti Sun Sunday 17 February 1952

External links

Craig Shipbuilding, Long Beach, CA

Patrol vessels of the United States Navy
Patrol vessels of the United States Coast Guard
Patrol vessels of the United States
World War II patrol vessels of the United States Coast Guard
World War II patrol vessels of the United States
1931 ships